The International Association for Cereal Science and Technology (ICC) was founded in 1955 and was originally called the International Association for Cereal Chemistry. It was set up to develop international standard testing procedures for cereals and flour. It has currently more than fifty member countries and headquarters in Vienna, Austria.

External links
 ICC home page
 List of ICC standard methods

Standards organisations in Austria
Food technology organizations
1955 establishments in Austria
Food chemistry
Cereals
Chemistry organizations